George Windsor may refer to:

 Prince George of Wales (born 2013), son of William, Prince of Wales, and Catherine, Princess of Wales
 George Windsor, Earl of St Andrews (born 1962), great-grandson of George V
 Prince George, Duke of Kent (1902–1942), son of George V
 George VI, King of the United Kingdom, Emperor of India (1895–1952)
 George V, King of the United Kingdom, Emperor of India (1865–1936)

See also
 George Windsor-Clive (disambiguation)
 George Windsor Earl (1813–1865), British navigator